Audace 1919 is an Italian association football club based in Genazzano, Lazio.

History 
They will play in season 2021–22 on Eccellenza Lazio championship.

Colors and badge 
The team's colors are blue, white and red.

Staff 

As of 16 July 2020

References

Football clubs in Italy
Football clubs in Lazio
Sport in Rome
Association football clubs established in 1919
1919 establishments in Italy